Zambian Breweries Plc is part of Anheuser-Busch InBev (ABInBev), the largest brewer in the world, with more than 400 beer brands and some 200,000 employees in over 50 countries.

Zambian Breweries was established in Zambia in 1968 and its product range has grown to include clear beers such as Mosi Lager, Castle, Carling Black Label, Eagle, Corona, Stella Artois, Budweiser, Flying Fish and Castle Lite.

History
 1963 – Started as Northern Breweries Limited, a private company formed by South African Breweries (SAB-80%) and Labatt Breweries of Canada (20%). Started brewing from plants in Ndola and Lusaka.
 1968 – Nationalised by the government and split into Zambian Breweries (Lusaka) and Northern Breweries (Ndola). Renamed Zambian Breweries Limited.
 1994 – Privatisation began.
 1997 – Listed on the Lusaka Stock Exchange
 1999 – Acquires Northern Breweries (Ndola) and the brand Rhino Lager.
 2002 – Acquires the Coca-Cola franchise for Zambia, with bottling plants in Kitwe and Lusaka.
 2016 - In December, after acquiring SABMiller, ABInBev agrees to sell African Coca-Cola bottling operations to Coca-Cola for an undisclosed sum. This includes the Zambia operation owned by Zambrew.
 2022 - In July, Zambia Breweries announced an US$ 80.0 million expansion of its Lusaka plant that is expected to generate 5,000 direct jobs when complete in 18 months.

Brands 

Mosi Lager, 
Eagle Lager,
Eagle Maize Lager,
Castle Lager, 
Castle Lite,
Carling Black Label,
Flying Fish,
Stella Artois, 
Budweiser 

The company has a virtual monopoly on clear brew products in Zambia.

Finance 
As of 31 December 2021, the company's total assets were ZMW 3,578,033,000, with shareholders' equity of ZMW 1,139,004,000.

For the fiscal (and calendar) year 2021, Zambian Breweries reported a net income of ZMW 147,952,000. The annual revenue was ZMW 3,068,959,000, an increase over the previous fiscal year.

Zambian Breweries is listed on the Lusaka Securities Exchange (LuSE). Zambian Breweries is traded on the LuSE under the ticker symbol “ZABR”.

Zambian Breweries Plc was the best performing stock in January 2022 on the Lusaka Securities Exchange (LuSE) after posting over ZMW 21.6 million, in turnover.

Zambian Breweries is currently the sixth most valuable stock on the Lusaka Securities Exchange with a market capitalization of ZMW 3.82 billion as of 14 April 2022.

Financial history 
In 1998, Zambian Breweries made a 100 percent takeover bid for what was then Northern Breweries, now National Breweries. The Zambian Competition Commission only gave tentative approval to the merger. Both breweries are listed on the Lusaka Stock Exchange in 2006.

Two balance sheets are published. But both breweries are constantly confused in financial reporting and "insider" financial services, making attribution of information immensely difficult. The reason for this may lie in the same major shareholder.

In 2017, the Lusaka Stock Exchange (LuSE) awarded the Zambian Breweries Plc the coveted Corporate Governance Awards for 2017 and 2017.

References

External links 
 Zambianbreweriesplc.com (official site)
Zambian Breweries Plc adopts the Warren Buffett investor relations model

Breweries
Food and drink companies of Zambia
Manufacturing companies of Zambia
Companies based in Lusaka
Ndola